Flight Lieutenant (aka Flight Captain and He's My Old Man) is a 1942 American drama war film starring Pat O'Brien as Sam Doyle, a disgraced commercial pilot who works to regain the respect of his son (Glenn Ford) against the backdrop of World War II.  Its advertising slogan was "roaring with thrills, throbbing with romance" with the love interest provided by Evelyn Keyes as Susie Thompson.

Flight Lieutenant was directed by Sidney Salkow, a Harvard Law School grad who had himself served in the Pacific and been shot down.

Plot
World War I combat pilot Sam Doyle has developed a drinking problem. In 1932, he causes the death of his co-pilot, William Thompson, and has his license revoked. A single parent, he leaves young Danny behind with a guardian and goes off to South America to find gainful employment. He leaves money to the dead co-pilot's widow and daughter, but the dead man's brother, John Thompson (Warren Ashe), wants revenge.

Danny grows up to be an expert pilot, becoming a Flight Lieutenant in the United States Army Air Corps. Thompson, now a major, becomes his superior officer. Neither has any knowledge of their shared history, even after Danny falls in love with Thompson's niece, Susie (Evelyn Keyes), and proposes marriage.

Sam Doyle returns, re-enlists and learns Danny is scheduled to test a new fighter aircraft that has a design flaw. Sam changes places with Danny at the last minute, flies but crashes the aircraft, saving future lives while sacrificing his own.

Cast

 Pat O'Brien as Samuel J. 'Sam' Doyle
 Glenn Ford as Danny Doyle
 Evelyn Keyes as Susie Thompson
 Jonathan Hale as Joseph Sanford
 Douglas Croft as Danny Doyle - as a boy 
 Ernie Adams as One-Legged Man (uncredited)
 Harry Anderson as Officer (uncredited)
 Warren Ashe as Mr. John Thompson (uncredited)
 Trevor Bardette as Carey (uncredited)
 Hugh Beaumont as Cadet John McGinnis (uncredited)
 James Blaine as Police Officer (uncredited)
 Lloyd Bridges as Cadet William "Bill" Robinson (uncredited)

Production
Production dates for Flight Lieutenant were from March 16 to April 18, 1942.

The aircraft in Flight Lieutenant were: 
 Ford Trimotor 4 ATE 
 Stearman C3B (in background)
 Brown B-3
 Stinson A
 Fairchild 24

Reception
A review in The New York Times considered that Flight Lieutenant was a "dreary father-and-son tale" with much mawkish sentimentality.

References

Notes

Citations

Bibliography

 Wynne, H. Hugh. The Motion Picture Stunt Pilots and Hollywood's Classic Aviation Movies. Missoula, Montana: Pictorial Histories Publishing Co., 1987. .

External links

 https://www.nytimes.com/movie/review?res=9F04E3D81239E33BBC4950DFB1668389659EDE

1942 films
1940s war drama films
American war drama films
American aviation films
American black-and-white films
Columbia Pictures films
1940s English-language films
Films directed by Sidney Salkow
World War II aviation films
Films produced by B. P. Schulberg
1942 drama films
1940s American films